Aimee Van Rooyen (born 20 December 1995) is a South African individual rhythmic gymnast. She represents her nation at international competitions. She competed at world championships, including at the 2011 World Rhythmic Gymnastics Championships. She was selected for the 2014 Commonwealth Games and 2010 Summer Youth Olympics.

References

External links 
 

1995 births
Living people
South African rhythmic gymnasts
Place of birth missing (living people)
Gymnasts at the 2010 Summer Youth Olympics
Gymnasts at the 2014 Commonwealth Games
Commonwealth Games competitors for South Africa